Cheetah In August is an American drama television series created by Anthony Bawn for Vimeo On Demand that debuted on August 25, 2015. The series was renewed for a second season.

Main cast 

 Andre Myers as August Chandler, former high school track star who has developed a condition which he believe he is able to heal through sexual connection
 Rashad Davis as Chanel Houston, successful author and news anchor 
 Judeline Charles as Donna Anderson, wife of Thatcher Anderson and TV journalist
 Devion Coleman as Brennen, personal assistant to Donna and on-and-off again lover of Chanel

Recurring cast 

 Devion Coleman as Brennen
 Donta Morrison as Chuck
 Jennipher Lewis as Cora
 Brentley Bawn as Cory
 Dre Matthews  as Donnie

Distribution 
The series was picked up by Amazon Video.

Episodes

Season 1

Season 2 (2016)

Plot
The show stars Andre Myers and Jonathan Medina, as therapist and patient who struggle to uncover the real condition of August. , from his high school years into adult life

The series touches on the topics of sexuality, love, religion, psychology, and self-hate. Dr. Thatcher Anderson (Jonathan Medina) is August's therapist hired by his former lover, author, and news anchor Chanel Houston (Rashad Davis). His patient is August Chandler (Andre Myers).

At the start of the season we are introduced to August's alter ego, "Cheetah", who is the main force preventing August from enjoying a monogamous relationship with his current lover Anthony (Brandon Anthony). The tables are turned when we discover that August had escaped from an abusive relationship with Chanel, and gets a job working in a local gay bar called Lady Marmalade owned by Chuck (Donta Morrison) along with his lover Corey (Brentley Willis).

In the midst of hiding from his past, August attempts to start over with Anthony. However, Chanel finds August and proclaims his love for him while admitting he is in a new relationship with Brennen (Devion Andrez Coleman), and that he plans to go public with the launch of his new book, Doors Open. August finds himself in a corner and calls Thatcher for help. Thatcher's wife Donna (Judeline Charles) is left in the dark about the developing relationship between August and Thatcher, only to find out through Thatcher's over-observant secretary Cora (Jennipher Lewis). Everything down spirals as Anthony discovers August's past and confronts him at Thatcher's office. The connections of each character intertwine within a web of sex, lies, deception, and murder.

Production 
Anthony Bawn created the pilot of Cheetah In August for Vimeo.com, and it became available for free streaming and download on August 25, 2015. He was inspired by Patrik-Ian Polk's 2005 series Noah's Arc.

Bawn has said that he hopes to use the series to explore ideas of ethnic LGBT identity through a "mentally confused young adult searching for normalcy" and that he pictured how a young black male growing up in a religious family could develop social desegregation within the gay community.

Cheetah In August premiered all twelve episodes simultaneously in late October 2015.

Awards

Season 1 (2015)

Season 2 (2016)

References

External links 
 
 

2015 American television series debuts
2010s American comedy-drama television series
English-language television shows
HIV/AIDS in television
LGBT African-American culture
Logo TV original programming
Television shows filmed in Vancouver
Same-sex marriage in television
2010s American LGBT-related comedy television series